Zoran Kastel (born 22 October 1972) is a Croatian professional football manager and former player who most recently  manager of Prva HNL club Varaždin.

Playing career

Club
Born in Varaždin, Kastel joined the youth academy of the local powerhouse Varteks. He was promoted to the club's first team squad for the 1998–99 season, and soon established himself as a regular member of the team, appearing in 23 league matches in his debut season. He had appeared in a total of 171 Prva HNL matches and scored 9 goals in his seven and a half seasons with Varteks, before leaving the club to join the Albanian Superliga side Dinamo Tirana during the winter break of the 2006–07 season. He played for the Albanian powerhouse for a season and a half, before retiring in July 2007.

Managerial career
Kastel replaced Samir Toplak as manager of Varaždin in December 2020.

Managerial statistics

References

External links
 
Zoran Kastel at 1.HNL.net 

1972 births
Living people
Sportspeople from Varaždin
Association football defenders
Croatian footballers
NK Osijek players
NK Belišće players
NK Inter Zaprešić players
NK Varaždin players
FK Dinamo Tirana players
Croatian Football League players
Kategoria Superiore players
Croatian expatriate footballers
Expatriate footballers in Albania
Croatian expatriate sportspeople in Albania
Croatian football managers